Jonathan Daniel Harper (born 15 February 1978) is an English session musician and started his musical career as the drummer for Reading-based British alternative rock band, The Cooper Temple Clause. He filled-in the vacancy for drummer in the Brazilian band Cansei de Ser Sexy (CSS) when Adriano Cintra took the place of Iracema Trevisan as bassist, after she left in April 2008.

In January 2010, Harper joined the Chris Corner (formerly of Sneaker Pimps) project IAMX as a member of the live band. He was also the drummer for IDLES between 2010 and 2011.

He attended the Forest School in Winnersh with the other original members of The Cooper Temple Clause band, with whom he grew up with in Reading. He has cited Led Zeppelin, Neil Young, dEUS, Sonic Youth, Primal Scream, Squarepusher, Miles Davis and Stevie Wonder as some of his main influences.

References

Living people
1978 births
English rock drummers
The Cooper Temple Clause members
CSS (band) members
21st-century drummers